Robert Cedric Sherriff, FSA, FRSL (6 June 1896 – 13 November 1975) was an English writer best known for his play Journey's End, which was based on his experiences as an army officer in the First World War. He wrote several plays, many novels, and multiple screenplays, and was nominated for an Academy Award and two BAFTA awards.

Early life
Sherriff was born in Hampton Wick, Middlesex, to insurance clerk Herbert Hankin Sherriff and Constance Winder. He was educated at Kingston Grammar School in Kingston upon Thames from 1905 to 1913. After he left school, Sherriff began working at an insurance office as a clerk in 1914.

Military service
Sherriff served as an officer in the 9th battalion of the East Surrey Regiment in the First World War, taking part in the fighting at Vimy Ridge and Loos. He was severely wounded at Passchendaele near Ypres in 1917.

Post war period
After recovering from his wounds, Sherriff worked as an insurance adjuster from 1918 to 1928 at Sun Insurance Company, London. 

Sherriff studied history at New College, Oxford, from 1931 to 1934. He was a fellow of the Royal Society of Literature and the Society of Antiquaries of London.

Career

Playwright
Sherriff wrote his first play to help Kingston Rowing Club raise money to buy a new boat. His seventh play, Journey's End, was written in 1928 and published in 1929 and was based on his experiences in the war. It was given a single Sunday performance, on 9 December 1928, by the Incorporated Stage Society at the Apollo Theatre, directed by James Whale and with the 21-year-old Laurence Olivier in the lead role. In the audience was Maurice Browne who produced it at the Savoy Theatre where it was performed for two years from 1929.

Novelist
Sherriff also wrote prose. A novelised version of Journey's End, co-written with Vernon Bartlett, was published in 1930. His 1939 novel, The Hopkins Manuscript is an H. G. Wells-influenced post-apocalyptic story about an earth devastated because of a collision with the Moon. Its sober language and realistic depiction of an average man coming to terms with a ruined England is said to have been an influence on later science fiction authors such as John Wyndham and Brian Aldiss. The Fortnight in September, an earlier novel, published in 1931, is a rather more plausible story about a Bognor holiday enjoyed by a lower-middle-class family from Dulwich. It was nominated by Kazuo Ishiguro as a book to 'inspire, uplift and offer escape' in a list compiled by The Guardian during the COVID-19 pandemic, describing it as "just about the most uplifting, life-affirming novel I can think of right now".

His 1936 novel Green Gates is a realistic novel about a middle-aged couple, Tom and Edith Baldwin, moving from an established London suburb into the then-new suburbs of Metro-land.

Award nominations
Sherriff was nominated along with Eric Maschwitz and Claudine West for an Academy award for writing an adapted screenplay for Goodbye, Mr. Chips which was released in 1939. His 1955 screenplays, The Dam Busters and The Night My Number Came Up were nominated for best British screenplay BAFTA awards.

Work

Plays
1921: A Hitch in the Proceedings
1922: The Woods of Meadowside
1923: Profit and Loss
1924: Cornlow-in-the-Downs
1925: The Feudal System
1926: Mr. Bridie's Finger
1928: Journey's End - the 2007 Broadway revival won the Tony Award for Best Revival of a Play and the Drama Desk Award for Outstanding Revival of a Play
1930: Badger's Green
1933: Windfall
1934: Two Hearts Doubled
1936: St Helena
1948: Miss Mabel
1950: Home at Seven
1953: The White Carnation
1955: The Long Sunset
1957: The Telescope
1960: A Shred of Evidence (or The Strip of Steel)

Film scripts
1919: The Toilers
1933: The Invisible Man
1934: One More River
1937: The Road Back
1939: Goodbye, Mr. Chips - which was nominated for the Academy Award for Best Adapted Screenplay along with his co-writers Claudine West, Eric Maschwitz.
1939: The Four Feathers
1941: That Hamilton Woman
1942: This Above All
1945: Odd Man Out
1948: Quartet
1950: Trio (film)
1950: No Highway
1955: The Dam Busters - which was nominated for the BAFTA Award for Best British Screenplay. 
1955: The Night My Number Came Up - which was nominated for the BAFTA Award for Best British Screenplay (NB: both films were nominated for the 1955 BAFTA awards). 
1955:	Cards with Uncle Tom (TV)
1963: The Ogburn Story (TV)

Books

 (Reprinted in 2006 by Persephone Books)
 (Reprinted in 2015 by Persephone Books)
 (Revised and reissued as a Pan Paperback in 1958 under the title The Cataclysm; Reprinted in 2005 by Persephone Books under its original title.)

Notes and references

Notes

References

Further reading

External links

Sherriff's literary agents

The Man from Esher and his Theatre of War

1896 births
1975 deaths
British Army personnel of World War I
East Surrey Regiment officers
Military personnel from Middlesex
English male screenwriters
Fellows of the Royal Society of Literature
Fellows of the Society of Antiquaries of London
People from Kingston upon Thames
War writers
Alumni of New College, Oxford
People educated at Kingston Grammar School
British male dramatists and playwrights
English male novelists
20th-century English novelists
20th-century English dramatists and playwrights
20th-century English male writers
Artists' Rifles soldiers
English male non-fiction writers
20th-century English screenwriters